Love Makes 'Em Wild is a 1927 American comedy film directed by Albert Ray and written by Harold Shumate. The film stars John Harron, Sally Phipps, Ben Bard, Arthur Housman, J. Farrell MacDonald and Natalie Kingston. The film was released on March 6, 1927, by Fox Film Corporation.

Cast        
John Harron as Willie Angle 
Sally Phipps as Mary O'Shane
Ben Bard as Blankenship
Arthur Housman as Charlie Austin
J. Farrell MacDonald as W. Barden
Natalie Kingston as Mamie
Albert Gran as Green
Florence Gilbert as Lulu
Earl Mohan as Sam 
Coy Watson Jr. as Jimmy
Noah Young as Janitor
William B. Davidson as Mamie's Ex-husband

References

External links
 

1927 films
1920s English-language films
Silent American comedy films
1927 comedy films
Fox Film films
Films directed by Albert Ray
American silent feature films
American black-and-white films
Films with screenplays by Florence Ryerson
1920s American films